"The Cry of the Wild Goose" is a 1950 song written by Terry Gilkyson. Originally performed by Frankie Laine, the song was the third of three consecutive number-one hits for him, following the previous year's hits "That Lucky Old Sun" and "Mule Train". The song was released on 78 rpm in early 1950 by Mercury Records with a catalog number of 5363.

The Laine version spent two weeks at number-one on the Billboard Most Played by Jockeys music chart in March 1950.

The song was later covered by Tennessee Ernie Ford. It was the uncredited theme song for the 1950 motion picture release Saddle Tramp. 

In a 1986 episode of Life With Lucy, Lucille Ball’s character talks about having an answering machine answer her call. She states that before she could leave a message, she had to listen to Frankie Laine sing "I must go where the wild goose goes", in reference to the lyrics to the song. 

Brian Setzer covered the song on 2003's Nitro Burnin' Funny Daddy, changing the title and lyrics to "wild wind" rather than "wild goose".

References

 

1950 songs
1950 singles
Frankie Laine songs
Mercury Records singles
Number-one singles in the United States
Songs written by Terry Gilkyson